Finland participated in the 2010 Summer Youth Olympics in Singapore.

The Finnish squad consisted of 19 athletes competing in 8 sports: aquatics (swimming), archery, athletics, badminton, gymnastics, sailing, shooting and wrestling.

Medalists

Archery

Boys

Girls

Mixed Team

Athletics

Boys
Track and Road Events

Field Events

Girls
Field Events

Badminton

Boys

Girls

Gymnastics

Artistic Gymnastics

Girls

Sailing

One Person Dinghy

Shooting

Rifle

Swimming

Wrestling

Girls' Freestyle

References

External links
Competitors List: Finland

Nations at the 2010 Summer Youth Olympics
2010 in Finnish sport
Finland at the Youth Olympics